Philip Ryan is a Gaelic footballer who plays for the St Brigid's club and previously for the Dublin county team.

In May 2021, Ryan was added to the Tipperary county team for the 2021 season.

Honours
 Leinster Under-21 Football Championship (1): 2012
 All-Ireland Under-21 Football Championship (1): 2012
 Leinster Senior Football Championship (1): 2015
 All-Ireland Senior Football Championship (1): 2015
 National Football League (4): 2013, 2014, 2015, 2016

References

Living people
Dublin inter-county Gaelic footballers
Tipperary inter-county Gaelic footballers
Year of birth missing (living people)